Bret Munsey (born August 19, 1968) is an American football coach. Previously he was the head coach for the Orlando Predators and Philadelphia Soul of the Arena Football League, and also an executive for the Florida Tuskers of the United Football League.

Playing career

College years
After graduating from Winter Park High School, Munsey played college football for Concord College, where he was a four-year starter and letterman. He led his team in receiving three of those years and was an All-West Virginia Intercollegiate Athletic Conference selection.

Arena Football League
Munsey played wide receiver/defensive back for the Orlando Predators in 1991.

Coaching career
Munsey began his coaching career as the defensive coordinator of the Augusta Stallions of af2 in 2000. He helped the Stallions to a 13–3 record and an American Conference Championship. In September 2001, Munsey left the Tennessee Valley Vipers to become the defensive coordinator of the Carolina Cobras. Munsey led the Philadelphia Soul to the Arena Bowl Championship in 2008.

Munsey was named the head coach of the Orlando Predators on August 19, 2011. After the Predators went 4–14 in the  season, missing the playoffs for the first time since , Munsey was released by the team.

Munsey was hired on June 19, 2013 by the NFL'S Philadelphia Eagles as a scout In 2014, Munsey joined the Washington Redskins to be the assistant special teams coach under Ben Kotwicka.

References

External links
Philadelphia Soul bio page
Bret Munsey (coach) at ArenaFan Online
Bret Munsey (player) at ArenaFan Online

1968 births
Living people
Sportspeople from Winter Park, Florida
American football wide receivers
American football defensive backs
Orlando Predators players
Augusta Stallions coaches
Philadelphia Soul coaches
Orlando Predators coaches
United Football League (2009–2012) executives
Florida Tuskers coaches
Carolina Cobras coaches
Alabama Vipers coaches
Washington Redskins coaches